The Superposed introduced a wide variety of innovations including the single select trigger and over-under design. This design was considered revolutionary in the 1930s, but it was later found that Browning had already made a model of this design in the 1880s.

History
It was the last firearm to be designed by John Browning. After Browning's death, the design work was completed by his son Val A. Browning. 
Original production dates were 1931–1940.
Original production grades were Grade I (Lightning/Standard), Pigeon, Diana and Midas.

Post World War II production began in 1948 and lasted until 1960 when the model underwent major changes.

References

Double-barreled shotguns